An ombudsman (also ,), ombud, ombuds, ombudswoman, ombudsperson or public advocate is an official who is usually appointed by the government or by parliament (usually with a significant degree of independence) to investigate complaints and attempt to resolve them, usually through recommendations (binding or not) or mediation.

Ombudsmen sometimes also aim to identify systemic issues leading to poor service or breaches of people's rights. At the national level, most ombudsmen have a wide mandate to deal with the entire public sector, and sometimes also elements of the private sector (for example, contracted service providers). In some cases, there is a more restricted mandate, for example with particular sectors of society. More recent developments have included the creation of specialized children's ombudsmen.

In some countries, an inspector general, citizen advocate or other official may have duties similar to those of a national ombudsman and may also be appointed by a legislature. Below the national level, an ombudsman may be appointed by a state, local, or municipal government. Unofficial ombudsmen may be appointed by, or even work for, a corporation such as a utility supplier, newspaper, NGO, or professional regulatory body.

In some jurisdictions an ombudsman charged with handling concerns about national government is more formally referred to as the "parliamentary commissioner" (e.g. the United Kingdom Parliamentary Commissioner for Administration, and the Western Australian state Ombudsman). In many countries where the ombudsman's responsibility includes protecting human rights, the ombudsman is recognized as the national human rights institution. The post of ombudsman had by the end of the 20th century been instituted by most governments and by some intergovernmental organizations such as the European Union.

Origins and etymology
A prototype of an ombudsman may have flourished in China during the Qin Dynasty (221 BC), and later in Korea during the Joseon Dynasty. The Roman Tribune had some similar roles, with power to veto acts that infringed upon the Plebeians. They were also attested in Siam, India, the Liao dynasty (Khitan Empire), Japan, and China.

From 1552, it is also used in other Nordic languages such as the Icelandic and Faroese , the Norwegian /, and the Swedish . The general meaning was and is approximately 'a man representing (someone)' (i.e., a representative) or 'a man with a commission (from someone)' (a commissioner). The Swedish-speaking minority in Finland uses the Swedish terminology. Thus, the modern plural form ombudsmen of the English borrowed word ombudsman is likely; but so was Emily O'Reilly's mild protest when she first was elected as the Ombudsman of Ireland:
I will be an ombudswoman, but will have no difficulty in being referred to as either.

Use of the term in its modern use began in Norway, and was followed by Sweden with the Swedish Parliamentary Ombudsman instituted by the Instrument of Government of 1809, to safeguard the rights of citizens by establishing a supervisory agency independent of the executive branch. The predecessor of the Swedish Parliamentary Ombudsman was the Office of Supreme Ombudsman, which was established by the Swedish King, Charles XII, in 1713. Charles XII was in exile in Turkey and needed a representative in Sweden to ensure that judges and civil servants acted in accordance with the laws and with their duties. If they did not do so, the Supreme Ombudsman had the right to prosecute them for negligence. In 1719 the Swedish Office of Supreme Ombudsman became the Chancellor of Justice. The Parliamentary Ombudsman was established in 1809 by the Swedish Riksdag, as a parallel institution to the still-present Chancellor of Justice, reflecting the concept of separation of powers as developed by Montesquieu.

The Parliamentary Ombudsman is the institution that the Scandinavian countries subsequently developed into its contemporary form, and which subsequently has been adopted in many other parts of the world. The word ombudsman and its specific meaning have since been adopted in various languages, such as Dutch. Notable exceptions are French, Italian, Spanish and Finnish, which use translations instead. Modern variations of this term include ombud, ombuds, ombudsperson, or ombudswoman, and the conventional English plural is ombudsmen. In Nigeria, the ombudsman is known as the Public Complaints Commission or the ombudsman.

In politics
In general, an ombudsman is a state official appointed to provide a check on government activity in the interests of the citizen and to oversee the investigation of complaints of improper government activity against the citizen. If the ombudsman finds a complaint to be substantiated, the problem may get rectified, or an ombudsman report is published making recommendations for change. Further redress depends on the laws of the country concerned, but this typically involves financial compensation. Ombudsmen in most countries do not have the power to initiate legal proceedings or prosecution on the grounds of a complaint. This role is sometimes referred to as a "tribunician" role, and has been traditionally fulfilled by elected representatives – the term refers to the ancient Roman "tribunes of the plebeians", whose role was to intercede in the political process on behalf of common citizens.

The major advantage of an ombudsman is that he or she examines complaints from outside the offending state institution, thus avoiding the conflicts of interest inherent in self-policing. However, the ombudsman system relies heavily on the selection of an appropriate individual for the office, and on the cooperation of at least some effective official from within the apparatus of the state. The institution has also been criticized: "Ombudsmen are relics of absolutism, designed to iron out the worst excesses of administrative arbitrariness while keeping the power structures intact."

In organizations

Many private companies, universities, non-profit organisations and government agencies also have an ombudsman (or an ombuds office) to serve internal employees, and managers and/or other constituencies. These ombudsman roles are structured to function independently, by reporting to the CEO or board of directors, and according to International Ombudsman Association (IOA) Standards of Practice they do not have any other role in the organisation. Organisational ombudsmen often receive more complaints than alternative procedures such as anonymous hot-lines.

Since the 1960s, the profession has grown in the United States, and Canada, particularly in corporations, universities and government agencies. The organizational ombudsman works as a designated neutral party, one who is high-ranking in an organization, but who is not part of executive management. Using an alternative dispute resolution (ADR) or appropriate dispute resolution approach, an organisational ombudsman can provide options to whistleblowers or employees and managers with ethical concerns; provide coaching, shuttle diplomacy, generic solutions (meaning a solution which protects the identity of one individual by applying to a class of people, rather than just for the one individual) and mediation for conflicts; track problem areas; and make recommendations for changes to policies or procedures in support of orderly systems change.

Ombudsman services by country
For specific ombudspersons or commissioners for children or young people, also see Children's ombudsman#Children's Ombudsman services by country.

Albania

The People's Advocate (ombudsman) of the Republic of Albania was envisaged in Chapter VI of the Albanian Constitution approved in November 1998 (articles 60–63 and 134). Article 60 states that "The People's Advocate defends the rights, freedoms and lawful interests of individuals from unlawful or improper actions or failures to act of the organs of public administration." The Parliament passed the Law on the People's Advocate, Law No. 8454, in February 1999. The People's Advocate is elected by three-fifths of all members of the Assembly for a five-year period, with the right of re-election. The Law has since been amended by Law No. 8600, of 10 April 2000, and Law No. 9398, of 12 May 2005.

The current Ombudsman is Erinda Ballanca, elected on 22 May 2017, succeeding Igli Totozani, elected on 23 December 2011, and Dr Emir Dobjani who had served since February 2000.

Andorra 
In the Principality of Andorra, the ombudsman is called .

Argentina
The  (The People's Defender of The Nation of Argentina), established in Article 86 of the Constitution, is an independent body related to the Argentine National Congress with functional autonomy, as it does not receive instructions from any authority and enjoys same immunities and privileges as a legislator.

The principal functions are, first, the defense of human rights and other rights, guarantees and interests protected by the Constitution, to acts or omissions of public administration, and secondly, the control of public administrative functions. By law, the Defender should be elected by the vote of 2/3 of the members present in each branch of Congress for a period of five years and may be reappointed.

However, no replacement was elected to fill the position, when the period of office ran out for the last person actually holding the office, Eduardo René Mondino, in 2008. Thus, the position has been vacant since 2009.

Armenia

The office of the Human Rights Defender, or Ombudsman, of Armenia was created through legislation in October 2003. The Human Rights Defender describes the goal of the office as the protection and restoration of human rights and fundamental freedoms. It also receives citizen complaints against state and local officials. In February 2004, Larisa Alaverdyan was appointed to the office by presidential decree. The second ombudsman was Armen Harutyunyan, who was elected by the National Assembly under article 83.1 of the Constitution on 17 February 2006, obtaining more than 3/5 votes of deputies. Karen Andreasyan was the third Human Rights Defender of Armenia. On 2 March 2011, the National Assembly elected the new Ombudsman, with 83 parliamentarians voting for and 13 against. Karen Andreasyan assumed his responsibilities as Human Rights Defender of Armenia on 3 March 2011. The fourth Ombudsman, Arman Tatoyan, was elected by the National Assembly in February 2016. Tatoyan was the former deputy Minister of Justice. Since 24 January 2022, Kristinne Grigoryan was elected as the fifth Human Rights Defender of Armenia by the National Assembly.

Australia

The first ombudsman created in Australia was the Western Australian Ombudsman in 1971, followed shortly by the South Australian Ombudsman in 1972 and the Victorian Ombudsman in 1973. The Commonwealth Ombudsman in Australia was established in 1976. The Ombudsman can investigate complaints about the actions and decisions of Australian Government departments and agencies, the services delivered by most private contractors for the Australian Government, and oversee complaint investigations conducted by the Australian Federal Police.

There are also ombudsman agencies in each state, a number of industry based ombudsmen, children's commissioners and many other complaint-handling and review agencies, as detailed in the main article.

Austria
The three-member Ombudsman Board (literally People's Representative) was created in 1977 as an independent authority monitoring Austria's entire public administration. It checks the legality of decisions by authorities and examines possible cases of maladministration. The members are appointed by parliament for six-year terms.

There are also children's ombudsman offices.

Azerbaijan
The Commissioner for Human Rights (Ombudsman) of the Republic of Azerbaijan is also the country's national human rights institution, initially accredited with A status by the International Co-ordinating Committee of NHRIs. GANHRI downgraded it to B status in May 2018. The first ombudsman, Elmira Süleymanova, was elected by the Parliament on 2 July 2002, and was reappointed in 2010 for a second term. Suleymanova (born 1937), formerly a professor of chemistry, had been active in the women's movement in Azerbaijan.
In November 2021, Parliament chose Sabina Aliyeva as the new ombudsperson. According to many international organizations and publications, Azerbaijan is one of the worst countries for journalists and human rights defenders in the world. The ombudsman's office has been criticized for turning a blind eye to complaints of torture and oppression of activists and the opposition.

Barbados
Under the Ombudsman Act 1980, the Ombudsman of Barbados is appointed by the Governor-General with the approval of both houses of the legislature. The current Ombudsman of Barbados is Valton Bend, a former Magistrate.

Bahrain

The Bahraini Ombudsman is an independent secretariat, financially and administratively, in the Ministry of the Interior of Bahrain established to ensure compliance with professional standards of policing set forth in the Code of Conduct for the Police, as well as in the administrative regulations governing the performance of civil servants.
It operates within a general framework that includes respect for human rights and the consolidation of justice, the rule of law and the public confidence, in line with Recommendation 1717 and Recommendation 1722 Paragraph (d) in the report by the Bahrain Independent Commission of Inquiry (BICI).
The Ombudsman assumes its authority and mission in full independence with respect to the complaints it receives against any civilian or public security personnel in the Ministry of the Interior of Bahrain for alleged criminal offense because of, during or as result of their scope of responsibilities.
In addition, the Ombudsman informs the competent authority in the Ministry of the Interior of Bahrain to take disciplinary action against violators employed by the ministry. It also informs the public prosecutor in the cases that constitute criminal offenses. It updates both the complainant and the defendant about the steps taken to investigate the complaints and the conclusions of the investigations.

Belgium
Belgium has one federal and four regional statutory ombudsman agencies, all covering the normal range of complaint-handling, investigation and mediation within the respective jurisdictions of their founding legislature.
 The office dealing with complaints against the federal authorities is the Federal Ombudsman. The office was established in 1997.
 The Vlaamse Ombudsdienst was established by the Flemish Parliament by decree of 7 July 1998 (the ).
 The Walloon Ombudsman, established by decree of the Walloon Parliament of 22 December 1994, seeks to help any person, natural or legal, who is experiencing difficulties with the Walloon regional authorities to arrive at a solution without litigation.
 The French Community Ombudsman, created by the Parliament of the French Community by decree of 20 June 2002, is responsible for handling complaints of citizens who encounter a problem with any administrative unit of the French Community. Its mission is to promote dialogue between the citizen and the administration concerned.
 In the smallest linguistic region, the Ombudsman of the German-Speaking Community was created by decree of 26 May 2009. This requires the Ombudsman to mediate between citizens and administrative authorities and seek alternative way to resolve conflicts, to settle disputes and, in some cases, to avoid litigation. In its plenary session of 17 May 2010, the Parliament of the German-speaking Community appointed Cedric Langer for a term of six years as the first Ombudsman.
Belgium also has separate children's commissioners for the French and Flemish communities.
There is a Pensions Ombudsman service at the federal level.

Bermuda
The Office of the Ombudsman for Bermuda was established by the Bermuda Constitution and is governed by the Ombudsman Act 2004. The first National Ombudsman for Bermuda, Arlene Brock, was appointed on 1 August 2005 by the Governor after consultation with the Premier who first consulted with the Opposition Leader. The Ombudsman investigates complaints about the administrative actions of Public Authorities, including Government Departments, Boards and Bodies established or funded by the Legislature.

Bosnia and Herzegovina
The Institution of Human Rights Ombudsman/Ombudsmen of Bosnia and Herzegovina is also the country's UN-accredited national human rights institution. It was created by law in 2004.

While the ombudsman's Child Rights Section is a member of the Children's Ombudsman network, there is a separate children's ombudsman in Republika Srpska.

Brazil
It is an independent entity that, according to the Constitution, has the function of ensuring the effective respect of Public Authorities, public services of relevance and the rights guaranteed in the Constitution, promoting the necessary measures to guarantee them.

Bulgaria
The Ombudsman of the Republic of Bulgaria is the national human rights institution, in addition to the normal range of functions in relation to maladministration. The institution was created as the 'Citizen's Defender' in 1998 but the first Ombudsman was elected in April 2005. Since 3 September 2019 the office has been held by Diana Kovacheva. There are also regional ombudsmen (Citizen's Mediators) in most parts of the country.

Canada
In Canada, ombudsman offices are present in most departments of the federal government, in many provincial and municipal governments as well as in Crown Corporations such as CBC and Canada Post. There is an Ombudsman for the Department of National Defence and the Canadian Forces, an Office of the Procurement Ombudsman, an Office for the Ombudsman for the Victims of Crimes, an Office of the Taxpayers' Ombudsperson and an Office of the Veterans Ombudsman.

There are also several independent ombuds offices in Canada, including the Ombudsman for Banking Services and Investments and various child advocate offices.

While Canada has no single national legislative ombudsman, nine Canadian provinces and one territory have parliamentary ombudsmen (sometimes called "citizens' protector" or "citizens' representative") in the classical/legislative tradition, who oversee the provincial government and receive and investigate public complaints. They are:
 Alberta Ombudsman, established 1967;
 Office of the Ombudsperson, British Columbia;
 Ombudsman Manitoba, established 1970;
 New Brunswick Ombudsman's Office, established 1967;
 Citizens' Representative of Newfoundland and Labrador;
 Nova Scotia Office of the Ombudsman, established 1970;
 Ontario Ombudsman, established 1975
 Ontario Patient Ombudsman, established 2015
 Quebec Ombudsman, established 1968;
 Ombudsman Saskatchewan, established 1972;
 Office of the Yukon Ombudsman and Information & Privacy Commissioner; and
 Ombudsperson Prince Edward Island, established 2022.

Chile
Chile remains in 2012 the only country in South America without a national ombudsman office, although one was envisaged in a constitutional reform proposed in the Senate by the President in 2000. Indeed, Chile is not listed as having an ombudsman on the website of the Ibero-American Federation of Ombudsmen.

Some other public bodies, such as the National Institute of Human Rights or the Transparency Council, have quasi-ombudsman functions, in that their statutes allow them to appeal to the legislature and judiciary for protection and development of fundamental rights. However, unlike many other ombudsman agencies, they do not have constitutional status, but were created by ordinary statutes.

Colombia

The People's Defender or Ombudsman's Office of Colombia is the national agency in charge of overseeing the protection of civil and human rights within the legal framework of the state of Colombia.

Costa Rica

The ombudsman office in Costa Rica, which is also the national human rights institution, is unique in bearing the name Defender of the Inhabitants. In 1993 it absorbed a former children's ombudsman office.

Cyprus
The Commissioner for Administration, usually referred to as the Ombudsman, is an Independent Authority in Cyprus and was established on 15 March 1991. The office is currently held by Maria Stylianou-Lottides.

There is also a Commissioner for Children's Rights.

Czech Republic
The Public Defender of Rights of the Czech Republic is more frequently referred to simply as ombudsman. The office was established in 1999. It has the traditional ombudsman role of mediating between complainants and officials in public bodies, but has no direct means or mechanisms of enforcement. Should the relevant body fail to provide a remedy, the ombudsman may refer the matter to the government. Following the death in office of the first ever Czech ombudsman, Otakar Motejl, in May 2010, former Constitutional Court judge Pavel Varvařovský was elected to the office by the lower house of parliament in September 2010. After his resignation in December 2013, Anna Šabatová, a deputy-ombudswoman from 2001 to 2007, was elected and sworn to the office in February 2014.

Denmark
 The Parliamentary Ombudsman was established in Denmark in 1955 to investigate complaints brought by an individual or ex officio in all matters relating to public governance, including maladministration by central or local authorities, on a case-by-case basis and on a general scale. The ombudsman's main areas of expertise include administrative law; constitutional law; the rights of inmates in correction facilities; and access to information. The ombudsman is appointed by the Parliament of Denmark.
 The Consumer Ombudsman was established in 1974 to ensure that the consumer protection and marketing rules are complied with by private undertakings. The ombudsman can ultimately institute legal proceedings before the Copenhagen Maritime and Commercial Court.
 In February 2011 the Danish government turned down a request from a United Nations committee to create the position of Ombudsman for Children. The government instead opted to create a specialized "children's office" as a part of the existing Ombudsman institution.

(Also note that the highest representatives of the Danish government in the Faroe Islands and Greenland, are called Royal Ombudsmen since 1948 and 1979, respectively. However, here the word is used more in its older general meaning of commissioner. See High Commission of Denmark, Tórshavn and High Commission of Denmark, Nuuk, respectively.)

Ecuador
In Ecuador, the officer known as People's Defender performs the functions of an ombudsman.

El Salvador
The country of El Salvador has a Human Rights Procurator, also referred to as ombudsman.

Estonia
The Chancellor of Justice of Estonia is an independent supervisor of the basic principles of the Constitution of Estonia and the protector of individual rights. The function of ombudsman was entrusted to the Chancellor of Justice in 1999. The Chancellor of Justice monitors whether state agencies comply with people's fundamental rights and freedoms and with the principles of good governance. In 2004 the ombudsman functions expanded to cover local governments, legal persons in public law and private persons who exercise public functions.

European Union
The European Ombudsman was established by the Maastricht Treaty, the treaty establishing the European Union. The current European Ombudsman, holding office since 1 October 2013, is Emily O'Reilly, former national ombudsman of Ireland. The European Union Ombudsman investigates claims by individuals or companies which reside or have their interests within the European Union against incidents of bad administration by bodies or institutions of the European Union.

Finland

In Finland the office of Parliamentary Ombudsman, modelled after the Swedish Ombudsman, was established by the Constitution of 1919. The Ombudsman is appointed by Parliament, and has the task of ensuring that all government departments and officials follow the law. The Parliamentary Ombudsman shares many duties with the Chancellor of Justice. The Ombudsman has wide-ranging oversight and investigative powers, has access to all government facilities, documents and information systems and can order a police investigation if necessary. If the Ombudsman determines that a government official has not acted in accordance with the law she or he can advise on the proper application of the law, reprimand the official or in extreme cases order a criminal prosecution. Partly because of the prosecutorial powers, the office enjoys considerable respect and the Ombudsman's legal opinions are usually strictly followed, carrying a lot of weight in the absence of a court precedent.

There are also special ombudsmen for gender equality (/), children's welfare (/), protection against discrimination (/), data protection, and consumer protection, operating under the auspices of various ministries and other government agencies. Every health care provider in Finland is legally obliged to have a patients' rights ombudsman.

France

In 1973, the French Government created an office of ombudsman. In July 2011 Dominique Baudis was appointed to the office by the Council of State on the nomination of the Prime Minister, for a single six-year term but died in April 2014. In June 2014, former minister Jacques Toubon was chosen for the following six years. Since 22 July 2020, the role has been held by former journalist and anti-poverty campaigner Claire Hédon.

Georgia

The Public Defender (Ombudsman) of Georgia is a national human rights institution. The office was established by Parliament in 1997. The Public Defender is elected for a six-year term by a parliamentary majority, and must follow the Constitution and the law, as well as the universally recognized principles and rules of international law, and international treaties and agreements concluded by Georgia. The Public Defender supervises the protection of human rights and fundamental freedoms, investigates violation of human rights and assists in securing redress. The office supervises the activities of national or local public authorities, public officials and legal persons, evaluates all acts passed by them and gives recommendations and proposals. The office also conducts human rights education.

Germany
The nearest equivalent to a federal ombudsman service in Germany is the Parliamentary Petitions Committee, which receives and investigates complaints of maladministration. There are a number of sectoral ombudsmen, including the Parliamentary Military-Ombudsman ( Bundestages) and the Ombudsman Institution for Public Transport (SÖP).

Gibraltar
The Gibraltar Public Services Ombudsman is an independent authority whose functions are to investigate complaints received from the general public about acts of maladministration by the Government of Gibraltar and certain public bodies and contractors. The Office of the Ombudsman came into being in April 1999 with the appointment of Henry Pinna as Gibraltar's first Public Services Ombudsman.

Greece
The Citizen's Advocate (ombudsman) of Greece was created in 1998 as an Independent Authority.  Following the resignation of Professor Georgios Kaminis in September 2010, the duties of the Citizen's Advocate passed to Deputy Ombudsman Kalliopi Spanou. The Advocate is assisted by six Assistant Advocates, who coordinate the activities of the Advocate's office in the six thematic areas in which the office has authority: i) civil rights, ii) social protection, iii) quality of life, iv) state-citizen relationships, v) children's rights, and vi) gender equality.

Hong Kong
The Office of The Ombudsman, known as the Commission for Administrative Complaints until 1994, is an independent statutory authority, established in 1989 under the Commissioner for Administrative Complaints Ordinance 1988, to redress grievances arising from maladministration in the public sector through independent and impartial investigations to improve the standard of public administration.

Hungary
After 1989, the end of the communist era multiple Parliamentary Commissioner, or ombudsman, posts were created:
 Commissioner for Civil Rights
 Privacy Commissioner
 Commissioner for Minority Rights
 Ombudsman for Future Generations (from 2008)

As of 1 January 2012, the four ombudsmen merged into one office of Commissioner for Fundamental Rights.

Iceland
The post of Althing Ombudsman was set up in 1987 under the terms of law number 13/1987, which deals with complaints against the government. The ombudsman's authority was expanded to local government levels in the 1997 law number 85/1997. The ombudsman is appointed for a four-year term by the parliament (Althing or ). The Ombudsman aims to safeguard the rights of the citizens vis-à-vis the State and local authorities, and to promote equality and good administrative practice.

India
The Government of India has designated several ombudsmen (sometimes called Chief Vigilance Officer (CVO)) for the redress of grievances and complaints from individuals in the banking, insurance and other sectors being serviced by both private and public bodies and corporations. The CVC (Central Vigilance Commission) was set up on the recommendation of the Santhanam Committee (1962–64).

Lokpal

In India, the Ombudsman is known as the Lokpal or Lokayukta. An Administrative Reforms Commission (ARC) was set up on 5 January 1966 under the Chairmanship of Shri Morarji Desai. It recommended a two-tier machinery: Lokpal at the Centre (parliamentary commissioner, as in New Zealand) and one Lokayukta each at the State level for redress of people's grievances. However, the jurisdiction of the Lokpal did not extend to the judiciary (as in case of New Zealand). The central Government introduced the first Lokpal Bill, Lokpal and Lokayuktas Bill in 1968, and further legislation was introduced in 2005. Final bill, after all the amendments, has been passed in Rajya Sabha on 17 December 2013 and passed in Loksabha on 18 December 2013.

Lokayukta

The state-level Lokayukta institution has developed gradually. Orissa was the first state to present a bill on establishment of Lokayukta in 1970, but Maharashtra was the first to establish the institution, in 1972. Other states followed: Bihar (1974), Uttar Pradesh (1977), Madhya Pradesh (1981), Andhra Pradesh (1983), Himachal Pradesh (1983), Karnataka (1984), Assam (1986), Gujarat (1988), Delhi (1995), Punjab (1996), Kerala (1998), Chhattishgarh (2002), Uttaranchal (2002), West Bengal (2003) and Haryana (2004). The structure of the Lokayukta is not uniform across all the states. Some states have UpaLokayukta under the Lokayukta and in some states, the Lokayukta does not have suo moto powers of instigating an enquiry.

Kerala State has an Ombudsman for Local Self Government institutions like Panchayats, Municipalities and Corporations. The ombudsman can enquire/investigate into allegations of action, inaction, corruption and maladministration. A retired Judge of the High Court is appointed by the Governor for a term of three years, under the Kerala Panchayat Raj Act.

In the State of Rajasthan, the Lokayukta institution was established in 1973 after the Rajasthan Lokayukta and Up-Lokayuktas Act, 1973 was passed by the State Legislature.

Non-banking financial companies 
The Reserve Bank of India launched an "Ombudsman Scheme" for redress of complaints against non-banking financial companies (NBFCs) free of charge.

This scheme is applicable to only those NBFCs which:
 Have assets of more than ₹1,000,000,000; AND/OR
 Accept deposits.

The complainant can file the complaint with the NBFC Ombudsman under whose jurisdiction the branch or registered office of the NBFC falls in the following cases:
 If the NBFC does not reply within a period of one month after receipt of the complaint; 
 If the complainant is not satisfied with the reply given by the NBFC;
 If the NBFC rejects, or does not acknowledge the complaint.

Anti-corruption movements

The 2011 Indian anti-corruption movement led by social activist Anna Hazare and Arvind Kejriwal includes in its demands the creation of a stronger ombudsman agency (with jurisdiction over all state institutions) through the enactment of a Jan Lokpal Bill, as an alternative to the Lokpal Bill proposed by the government in 2010.

Indonesia
The Ombudsman of the Republic of Indonesia previously named the National Ombudsman Commission is a state institution in Indonesia that has the authority to oversee the implementation of public services both organized by state officials and government, including those held by State-Owned Enterprises, Regionally-Owned Enterprises, and State-Owned Legal Entities private or individuals who are given the task of carrying out certain public services which part or all of their funds are sourced from the State Revenue and Expenditure Budget or the Regional Revenue and Expenditure Budget. This institution was formed based on Law Number 37 of 2008 concerning the Ombudsman of the Republic of Indonesia which was ratified at the DPR RI Plenary Meeting on 9 September 2008.

Iran
The State Ombudsman of Iran is the General Inspection Office. This office was one of the Founding Members of AOA (Asian Ombudsman Association) and hosted the 4th and 13th AOA annual conferences in 1999 and 2013.
In Iran an organization called  or 'the Administration Justice Court' is set to investigate the complaints of any government employee or staff member who has been discriminated against.

Ireland
The Office of the Ombudsman was set up under the terms of the Ombudsman Act 1980. The Ombudsman is appointed by the President of Ireland upon the nomination of both Houses of the Oireachtas, and is a civil servant of the State. The Ombudsman deals with complaints against Departments of State, local authorities, the Health Service Executive (Ireland), private and public nursing homes and direct provision accommodation services.

There are other ombudsmen established in Ireland. The first Pensions Ombudsman, Paul Kenny, was appointed in 2003. Emily Logan became Ireland's first Ombudsman for Children in March 2004. The Financial Services Ombudsman incorporated the older offices of the Insurance Ombudsman and Ombudsman for Credit Institutions in 2005. Also established in 2005 was the Office of the Ombudsman for the Defence Forces, the first holder being Paulyn Marrinan Quinn, formerly the founding Insurance Ombudsman. An Act of 2005 created a three-person tribunal, the Garda Síochána Ombudsman Commission, to investigate complaints about the country's police force. All these offices are statutory and their holders are public servants.

A (non-statutory) Press Ombudsman began work in January 2008 and legislation has been published to establish a Legal Services Ombudsman.  The Ombudsman (Amendment) Bill of 2008 provided for the statutory protection of the title of Ombudsman. This was passed as the Ombudsman (Amendment) Act 2012, which increased the number of State agencies under the Ombudsman's remit, and also designated the Ombudsman as Director (Chief Executive) of the Office of the Commission for Public Service Appointments.

Irish Ombudsmen to date have been Michael Mills from 1984 to 1994, Kevin Murphy from 1994 to 2003, Emily O'Reilly from 2003 to 2013, and Peter Tyndall, who was appointed in December 2013.

Israel
The State Comptroller also serves, by law, as Ombudsman. She or he discharges this function by way of a special unit in the Office of the State Comptroller, known as the Office of the Ombudsman. The Ombudsman investigates complaints against bodies that are statutorily subject to audit by the State Comptroller, including government ministries, local authorities, state enterprises and institutions and government companies, as well as their employees.

Italy
There is no generic national ombudsman office, but by Law no. 112 of 12 July 2011, an Ombudsman for childhood and adolescence was set up as an independent institute. Many units of sub-national government (regions, provinces and communes) have their own ombudsman, who are elected by regional, provincial or communal councils.

Jamaica
The Office of the Public Defender was created in 2000 by the Public Defender Act 1999, replacing the Office of the Parliamentary Ombudsman of Jamaica which had existed since 1978. The Public Defender (currently Earl Witter) has the typical ombudsman function of investigating and remedying maladministration, with additional jurisdiction to investigate alleged violations of constitutional rights.

Kazakhstan
The Commissioner for Human Rights, or National Ombudsman of the Republic of Kazakhstan, is Askar Shakirov, appointed in 2007. The office was created by presidential decree in 2002 as a national human rights institution, with support from the OSCE.

In 2021, the lower house of Kazakhstan's Parliament, known as the Majilis, adopted a draft law on the Ombudsperson for Human Rights in the country. They also adopted legislative amendments to define the level of legal status of the Ombudsperson and the principles of their role.

Kenya
The Commission on Administrative Justice was established by the Commission on Administrative Justice Act 2011(hereafter referred to as the Act) pursuant to Article 59 (4) of the Constitution of Kenya. CAJ is a Commission within the meaning of chapter 15 of the constitution and has the status and powers of a commission under that chapter.

Kosovo
The Ombudsperson Institution in Kosovo (OIK) accepts and investigates complaints of human rights violations or abuses of authority by any public authority in Kosovo. The institution is currently led by Ombudsperson Sami Kurteshi, a former opposition activist, political prisoner and human rights activist, who was elected to the post by the Assembly of Kosovo on 4 June 2009. In October 2011 the Assembly elected five deputy Ombudspersons: Isa Hasani, Bogoljub Staletovic [from the Serb community], Shqipe Malaj-Ibra, Ibrahim Arslan (from the Turkish community) and Basri Berisha.

The first Ombudsperson, Marek Antoni Nowicki, was appointed in July 2000 by the then Special Representative of the United Nations Secretary-General (SRSG), Bernard Kouchner; Nowicki's appointment was renewed in 2002, 2004 and 2005 by subsequent SRSGs Michael Steiner, Harri Holkeri and Søren Jessen-Petersen. With effect from 1 January 2006 Jessen-Petersen appointed a Kosovar lawyer, Hilmi Jashari, as Acting Ombudsperson and he remained in post until Kurteshi took office.

The OIK has several offices throughout Kosovo, and participates (although not yet accredited) in the global network of national human rights institutions, as well as in the European ombudsman network.

Kyrgyz Republic
The Ombudsman of the Kyrgyz Republic carry out parliamentary control over the observance of the rights and freedoms of man and citizen.

Latvia
Since 2007, the Latvian ombudsman is a personalized institution literally called Rights Defender. The current Ombudsman since 2011 is Juris Jansons. Previously, similar functions were carried by National Human Rights Office (1995–2006).

Lithuania

In Lithuania, the nearest equivalent to the position of ombudsman is that of Parliamentary Controller, an office appointed by the Seimas (Parliament of Lithuania).

There is also a children's ombudsman.

Malta

Since 1995, Malta has a Commissioner for Administrative Investigations known as the Ombudsman. The Office of the Ombudsman is a constitutional body established by the Constitution of Malta and is regulated by the Ombudsman Act. The Ombudsman may investigate, suo motu or on foot of a complaint, the actions of State bodies or other public entities. In Malta, the Ombudsman is also an Officer of Parliament and is appointed by the House of Representatives of Malta through a resolution supported by votes of not less than two-thirds of all members of the House. The Ombudsman may be assisted by other Commissioners appointed for specialised areas in accordance to the law. The recommendations issued by the Maltese Office of the Ombudsman are not binding legally but do have a persuasive value.

Mexico
National Human Rights Commission (Mexico)

On 13 February 1989 the Interior Ministry Secretariat of the Interior created the "General Human Rights Department" as a wholly dependent office within the ministry's structure. On 6 June 1990, by presidential decree, the General Human Rights Department was renamed the "National Human Rights Commission" and gained full autonomy from its parent ministry.

It was not until 1990, after some constitutional reforms, that the National Human Rights Commission became fully independent of the government.

The (in 2022) current president (ombudsman) is María del Rosario Piedra Ibarra

Moldova
There have been officials with ombudsperson functions in the Republic of Moldova at least since 1998, but with some differences in the names of the offices and contexts. Since 2014, the ombudsperson is named the People's Advocate (Ombudsman), and together with a General Secretary and the Children's Advocate is heading an office involving 65 persons, including representatives for four autonomous regions. People's Advocate since 24 September 2021 is Natalia Moloșag, and Children's Advocate (formally: People's Advocate for Child's Rights) since 8 April 2016 is Maia Bănărescu.

Nepal 
In the Nepalese context there are mainly two organizations working as 'Ombudsman type' organization. The Constitution of Nepal (2015) has continued the establishment of the Commission for the Investigation of Abuse of Authority as a powerful body against corruption prevention. Earlier, by the second amendment of the Constitution of The Kingdom of Nepal in 1975 established an Ombudsmen type Corruption Prevention Commission with a wide role of corruption investigation, adjudication and prosecution. Yet, another institution against corruption vigilance National Vigilance Center (NVC) is established and NVC works under the direct supervision of the Prime Minister.

Netherlands 
Article 78 of the Constitution of the Netherlands, as revised in 1983, established an office of National Ombudsman. The Ombudsman may investigate, suo motu or on foot of a complaint, the actions of State bodies or other public entities. The ombudsman and deputy are appointed by the House of Representatives for a fixed period or until reaching retirement age. The office includes a children's ombudsman.

New Zealand

The post of Ombudsman was established in New Zealand in 1962, to investigate complaints against government departments. In 1975 the post was expanded, with a Chief Ombudsman and several other ombudsmen. In 1983 his responsibilities were extended to include investigation of agencies that fail to provide information requested in accordance with the Official Information Act 1982. The Ombudsman also has responsibility to protect 'whistleblowers' and investigate the administration of prisons and other places of detention.

There is also a Children's Commissioner. New Zealand also has three industry ombudsmen – the New Zealand Banking Ombudsman, the Insurance and Savings Ombudsman, and the Electricity and Gas Complaints Commissioner who is an ombudsman in all but name.

North Macedonia
Since 1997 North Macedonia has an Ombudsman for protection of citizens rights. The ombudsman is appointed by the Parliament and performs her or his work under the Constitution and the Law of the Ombudsman.

Norway
 The Gender Equality and Anti-Discrimination Ombud was established in 1978 as the Gender Equality Ombud, the first of its kind in the world. In 2006, the Ombud was reorganised to include discrimination in general. The Ombud's task is to enforce the Norwegian Gender Equality Act and the act relating to prohibition of discrimination on the basis of ethnicity, national origin, ancestry, skin colour, language, religious and ethical orientation, and sexual orientation (Discrimination Act). The Ombud is also tasked with enforcing the anti-discrimination regulations in the Working Environment Act. The mandate of the Ombud also includes to actively promote equality for discriminated groups, and to develop new knowledge through documentation and monitoring.
 The Norwegian Parliamentary Ombud investigates complaints from citizens or may take up issues on its own initiative: complaints from citizens concerning injustice or maladministration from central government or local authorities.
 The Parliamentary Ombudsman for the Norwegian Armed Forces shall safeguard the rights of all members and former members of the Armed Forces as well as contribute to an effective military defence. Anyone who feels that they have been wrongly, unjustly or unreasonably treated can bring their case before the Ombudsman and request an investigation of the matter to determine whether an injustice has been done, and to secure any appropriate corrective action. Issues and circumstances arising before, during or after military service can be brought to the attention of the Ombudsman.
 The Ombudsman for Children has statutory rights to protect children and their rights. Since 1981, the Ombudsman for Children in Norway has worked continuously to improve national and international legislation affecting children's welfare. Norway was the first country in the world to establish an ombudsman for children.
 There is also an ombudsman for consumer affairs; see Norwegian Consumer Ombudsman.
 Local and regional authorities often have ombudsmen. Examples of this are ombudsmen for health and social affairs, ombudsmen for the elderly and ombudsmen for school students and apprentices at the upper secondary level.

Panama

Pakistan
In Pakistan, the establishment of an ombudsman institution had been advocated for some time before Article 276 of the Interim Constitution of 1972 provided for the appointment of a Federal Ombudsman and Provincial Ombudsmen. The office of Federal Ombudsman is currently held by Salman Farooqi. The Ombudsman has headquarters in Islamabad and Regional Offices in Lahore, Sukkur, Quetta, Faisalabad, Multan, Dera Ismail Khan, Peshawar and Karachi, Abbottabad.

Other ombudsman agencies in Pakistan include Provincial Ombudsman with offices in Punjab, Balochistan, Khyber Pakhtunkhwa and Sindh; a banking ombudsman, the Banking Mohtasib Pakistan; a Federal Insurance Ombudsman and a Federal Tax Ombudsman. The autonomous region of Azad Jammu and Kashmir also has an ombudsman office, the AJK Mohtasib. Under the Protection of Women against Harassment at Workplace Act 2010, Musarrat Hilali was appointed in the same year to be the first Federal Ombudsperson for Protection of Women against Harassment at Workplace. The Act provides for similar offices at the provincial level.

The various ombudsman agencies participate in a Forum of Pakistan Ombudsman (FPO), and the federal bodies are affiliated to the Asian Ombudsman Association (AOA) and the International Ombudsman Institute (IOI).

Peru
The Peruvian ombudsman agency is the Public Defender. The functions of the institution, which was envisaged by the 1993 Constitution and was created in 1996, include combating maladministration, human rights violations and discrimination. It has 36 offices throughout the country. The current  (ombudsman), Beatriz Merino, was elected by Congress on 29 September 2005 for a five-year term. The  is accredited with 'A' status as the national human rights institution. There is also a specialised Police Ombudsman.

Philippines
The Office of the Ombudsman of the Philippines is empowered by the 1987 Constitution to safeguard both the government and government-owned corporations from corruption and dispense justice in the case of such offenses.

The Permanent Commission 
In the Philippines, the Permanent Commission in the Revolutionary Government may be considered a precursor of the present Office of the Ombudsman. Article 21 of the Decree of June 23, 1898 creating the Revolutionary Government of the Philippines provided for a Permanent Commission, presided over by the Vice President, that shall decide on appeal all criminal cases decided by provincial councils. These cases were those filed against Department Secretaries and provincial and municipal officials.

The Permanent Commission continued its existence after the ratification of the Constitution of 1899, popularly known as the Malolos Constitution. Under No. 1, Article 55 of said Constitution, one of the powers of the Commission was to "declare if there is sufficient cause to proceed against the President of the Republic, the Representatives, Department Secretaries, the Chief Justice of the Supreme Court and the Solicitor General in the cases provided by the Constitution.

In previous administrations 
Succeeding administrations likewise provided for the creation of agencies to handle cases of corruption in the government service. An Integrity Board was created by President Quirino in 1950. President Magsaysay immediately upon assumption to office created the Presidential Complaints and Action Commission in 1957. President Garcia created the Presidential Committee on Administration Performance Efficiency in 1958 and President Macapagal created a Presidential Anti-Graft Committee in 1962. President Marcos in 1966 created a Presidential Agency on Reforms and Government Operations.

In 1969, the Office of the Citizen's Counselor was created by Republic Act No. 6028. However, like the previous agencies created by past administrations, the functions of the Citizen's counselor were mainly to conduct fact-finding investigations and to make recommendations to Congress and the President. Moreover, RA No. 6028 was not at all implemented. Subsequently, President Marcos created a Complaints and Investigation Office in 1970 and the Presidential Administrative Assistance Committee in the following year.

The Tanodbayan 
The 1973 Constitution (Sections 5 and 6, Article XIII) provided for the establishment of a special court known as the Sandiganbayan and an Office of the Ombudsman known as the Tanodbayan. Presidential Decree Nos. 1486 and 1487 created the Sandiganbayan and Tanodbayan, respectively, on 11 June 1978. Subsequent amendments were made to both decrees.

The Tanodbayan shall receive and investigate complaints relative to public office, including those in government-owned or controlled corporations, make appropriate recommendations, and in appropriate cases, file and prosecute criminal, civil or administrative cases before the proper court or body. On the other hand, the Sandiganbayan shall have jurisdiction over criminal and civil cases involving graft and corrupt practices and such other offenses committed by public officers and employees, including those in government-owned or controlled corporations.

At present 
The framers of the 1987 Constitution envisioned the Ombudsman as an official critic who studies the laws, procedures and practices in government, a mobilizer who ensures that the steady flow of services is accorded the citizens, and a watchdog who looks at the general and specific performance of all government officials and employees. (cf. Journal No. 40, 26 July 1986, p. 432). To further strengthen and insulate the Office of the Ombudsman from politics and pressure forces, the Constitution made it a fiscally autonomous body, (cf. Sec. 14, Art. XI, 1987 Constitution) independent from any other branch of government, and headed by an Ombudsman with a fixed term of seven years, who could be removed from office only by way of impeachment. (cf. Sec. 2, Art. XI, 1987 Constitution). The Ombudsman and his Deputies enjoy the rank of Chairman and members, respectively, of a Constitutional Commission whose appointments require no Congressional confirmation. (cf. Secs. 9 and 10, Art. XI, 1987 Constitution).

The clear intent is to give full and unimpeded play to the exercise by said Office of its extraordinary range of oversight and investigative authority over the actions of all public officials and employees, offices and agencies. Not only can it investigate on its own or on complaint any official act or omission that appears to be illegal, unjust, improper or inefficient; it can prod officials into performing or expediting any act or duty required by law; stop, prevent and control any abuse or impropriety in the performance of such duties; require the submission of documents relative to contracts, disbursements, and financial transactions of government officials for the purpose of ferreting out any irregularities therein. (cf. Sec. 13, Art. XI, 1987 Constitution). The conferment of this extensive authority is prefaced in the Constitution with the bestowal upon the Ombudsman and his deputies of the appealing title of "Protectors of the People" (cf. Sec. 12, Art. XI).

On 24 July 1987, Executive Order No. 243 was issued by President Corazon C. Aquino declaring the effectivity of the creation of the Office and restating its composition, powers and functions. On 12 May 1988, the Office of the Ombudsman became operational upon the appointment of the Ombudsman and his Overall Deputy Ombudsman. Immediately thereafter, one Deputy Ombudsman each for Luzon, Visayas and Mindanao were likewise appointed by the President. This date became the basis for celebrating the anniversary of the Office of the Ombudsman.

On 17 November 1989 the Congress enacted Republic Act No. 6770, otherwise known as the Ombudsman Act of 1989, providing for the functional and structural organization of the Office of the Ombudsman and delineating its powers functions and duties. Indeed, Congress, in enacting Republic Act 6770, sought to have an Ombudsman who would be an effective and an activist watchman vesting the Ombudsman with adequate authority that would prevent the Ombudsman from being a "toothless tiger". (cf. Journal, Session No. 15, 17 August 1988)

Poland
The office also functions as the national human rights institution, and is accredited with A status by the ICC. The holder of the office from 2006, Dr Janusz Bogumił Kochanowski, died in the April 2010 Smolensk air disaster. He was succeeded by Irena Lipowicz. Since 2015, this position was held by Adam Bodnar, but on 15 April 2021 the pro-government Constitutional Tribunal forced him out of office, although then no replacement had been appointed. However, after some time, Marcin Wiącek(pl) was appointed new ombudsman.

Portugal
"Proveditor of Justice"), and its role is defined in article 23 of the Constitution of Portugal:

Besides the traditional routes, complaints can be filed online and there are toll-free lines for children and one for senior citizens. The first Ombudsman was Manuel da Costa Brás (Tenente-Coronel, Lieutenant Colonel).

Romania

The ombudsman office is the People's Advocate. Since 26 June 2019, the current ombudsman is Renate Webber, preceded by Victor Ciorbea since 15 April 2014.

Russia
The Russian Federation's Commissioner for Human Rights (ombudsman) position is held by Tatyana Moskalkova . The Commissioner is appointed for a fixed term by the Parliament. The ombudsman cannot be dismissed before the end of their term, and is not subordinate to any body of power, including the President or the Government.

Russia's 83 administrative regions have the right to elect a local ombudsman whose authority is limited to that region. Fewer than half had done so .

There is also a Children's Rights Commissioner post, appointed by the President. The post was held by Anna Kuznetsova from 2016–2021.

In June 2012, Vladimir Putin signed the Executive Order on the Presidential Commissioner for Entrepreneurs' Rights, appointing Boris Titov to the position.

Serbia
In Serbia, the Protector of Citizens of the Republic of Serbia (Ombudsman) is an independent state authority, mandated to protect human rights and freedoms. It was introduced into the legal system in 2005 by the Law on Ombudsman and confirmed by the Constitution of Serbia in 2006. Ombudsman is elected by the National Assembly of the Republic of Serbia for a five-year-term and is accountable to the Assembly for his work. The Ombudsman enjoys the same immunity as a member of the parliament.

The first Serbian Ombudsman, Saša Janković, was elected by the National Assembly in July 2007. He has four deputies, who are specialized in several fields, especially the protection of rights of persons deprived of liberty, gender equality, children rights, minority rights and rights of people with disabilities.

The Ombudsman has competence to oversee the work of government agencies, the bodies authorized for legal protection of property rights and interests of the Republic of Serbia and other bodies and organizations, enterprises and institutions which have been delegated public authority. He has no jurisdiction over the National Assembly, the President, the Government, the Constitutional Court, courts and Public Prosecutor's Office. The Ombudsman initiates proceedings following the complaint of a citizen or on his own initiative. State administration bodies are legally obliged to cooperate with the Ombudsman and to provide him access to their premises and all data in their possession, regardless of the degree of secrecy, when of interest to the investigation in process or the Ombudsman's preventive actions. As a result of an investigation, the Ombudsman may recommend dismissal of an official considered responsible for violation of the rights of citizens, may initiate disciplinary procedures against public administration employees, and may require initiation of penal, offence or other adequate procedure.

The Ombudsman can also act preemptively, by offering advice and opinion on issues within his competence, to enhance the operation of the administration authorities and strengthen the protection of human liberties and rights. The Ombudsman is entitled to propose laws within its scope of competence, give opinions to the Government and the National Assembly on regulations under preparation and address the Constitutional Court to challenge the constitutionality of laws.

The Ombudsman provides the National Assembly with an annual report on his work and findings as well as with other special reports.

The Ombudsman has full membership in the European Ombudsman Institute (EOI), the International Ombudsman Association (IOA), the European Network of Ombudspersons for Children (ENOC) and the Association of Mediterranean Ombudsmen (AOM). In May 2010, it was accredited with 'A' status as the national human rights institution.

Slovakia 
The role of ombudsman was established as a result of the Ombudsman Act (564/2001). The National Assembly appoints a candidate to this position with a term of five years and a maximum of two consecutive terms. At a minimum, the ombudsman provides the National Council with an annual report. In case of a severe violation of fundamental rights, or a large number of people affected, the ombudsman can release a special or extraordinary report at any time. This occurred three times between 2013 and 2017, but because of the "opposition background" of the second most recent ombudsman, Judge Jana Dubovcová, her concerns were ignored by the assembly majority, many members of parliament were absent during her speeches, and public institutions were allowed to ignore the report, so no actions were actually taken to correct the situation. The most recent ombudsman, lawyer and university teacher Mária Patakyová, was elected in March 2017.

Slovenia

The institution of the Human Rights Ombudsman of the Republic of Slovenia was introduced into the Slovenian constitutional order through the new Constitution of the Republic of Slovenia, which was adopted in December 1991. The Human Rights Ombudsman is defined in Article 159 of the Constitution, which provides that in order to protect human rights and fundamental freedoms in relation to state authorities, local self-government authorities and bearers of public authority, the office of the Ombudsman for the rights of citizens shall be established by law.

The Human Rights Ombudsman of the Republic of Slovenia is a constitutional category that does not fall under the executive, judicial or legislative branch of authority. The Ombudsman is therefore not part of any mechanism of authority, but rather acts as an overseer of authority since as an institution it restricts its capricious encroachment of human rights and fundamental freedoms.

The Ombudsman is in his work not only limited to handling direct violations defined as human rights and freedoms in the constitution, moreover, he may act in any case whatsoever dealing with a violation of any right of an individual arising from a holder of authority. He can intervene also in the case if unfair and poor state administration in relation to the individual. If the aforementioned is considered, it can have a significant impact on the development and increase in legal and administrative culture between holders of authority and the individual.

Human rights ombudsman is in relation towards the state bodies, autonomous and independent agency.

The Ombudsman can caution violators that they should put right their violation or eliminate irregularities committed, or can even propose compensation. On one's behalf, and with their authorisation, he can lodge with the Constitutional Court a request for assessment of the constitutionality and legality of regulations or official documents, or may submit a constitutional complaint owing to the violation of some right. He may submit to the government or parliament initiatives for the amendment of laws and other regulations. He may also suggest to all bodies that fall within his competence that they improve their dealings and relations with clients.
The Ombudsman may also communicate his opinion to anyone regarding cases that are linked to the violation of rights and freedoms. Here it is not important what kind of procedure is involved, nor the stage of processing it has reached at the body in question.

The Ombudsman cannot perform work or remove violations or irregularities in place of the specific state body, local community body or holder of public authorisation. Those that committed the violation or irregularity are bound also themselves to putting right the violation or
irregularity. Equally, the Ombudsman cannot deal with cases that are subject to court proceedings, except in exceptional cases.

South Africa

 Public Protector
 Auditor-General

Spain

The office is prominent in the international networks of ombudsmen and national human rights institutions, particularly through the Ibero-American Ombudsman Federation (FIO).

Ombudsmen in the autonomous communities 
There are comparable offices in the autonomous communities of Spain, as follows:
  (Andalusia)
  (Aragon)
  (full name on website) (Basque Country)
  (Canary Islands)
  (Castile and León)
  (Catalonia)
 Personero del Común (Extremadura)
  (Galicia)
  (Balearic Islands)
  (Murcia)
 / (Navarre)
  (Valencian Community)

See also Syndic for more uses of the word  in the Catalan linguistic area.

Former ombudsmen in the autonomous communities 

  (Asturias)

Sweden

The office was modelled after Chancellor of Justice, and according to the principle of separation of powers. The Chancellor of Justice was installed in 1714 as a proxy for King Charles XII of Sweden, to act as a representative for the Royal Government. Today it acts as an ombudsman, mainly to oversee that Swedish authorities comply with laws on behalf of the Government, but also to handle indemnity claims from persons suffered from imprisonment but later acquitted, or other damages caused by authorities.

The Parliamentary Ombudsman was in turn appointed to represent the parliament; to oversee that all public authorities comply with the laws and decrees. The latter had the specific duty to protect the citizens and as a public attorney prosecute unlawful government or actions by authorities and criticise problematic laws, to ensure equality in the court of law, with inspections and handling of complains.

With growing attention to discrimination issues in the latter part of the 20th century a number of new anti-discriminatory Ombudsmen was appointed, to later be gathered under one roof, with the establishment of the Equality Ombudsman in 2009.

The Ombudsman for Children was established in 1993, and is tasked with matters affecting the rights and interests of children and young people.

The Director-General of the Swedish Consumer Agency is the designated Consumer Ombudsman.

Taiwan
Under the R.O.C. Constitution and its seventh amendments, the Control Yuan, one of the five branches of the Taiwanese government, functions as the ombudsman. Other than acting as the auditor of national government and being responsible for impeachment of officials, the Control Yuan investigates petitions and complaints from the general public about government policies and misdeeds committed by officials (both national and regional), and proposes corrective measures. The government agencies in question need to respond to the proposed measures within two months from the date of issue.

The 29 Members of Control Yuan are nominated by the President and confirmed by the Legislative Yuan to serve a six-year renewable term.

In 2020, the National Human Rights Commission was established under the Control Yuan as a national human rights institution in line with the Paris Principles with power to investigate human rights abuse, to facilitate legislation of human rights protection and to promote human rights education.

Tajikistan
The Office of the Human Rights Ombudsman was established in 2009, and receives support from the OSCE. The current Ombudsman is Zarif Alizoda, appointed by President Emomalii Rahmon and approved by Parliament in May 2009. The functions of his office include human rights education, on which it co-operates with other public bodies and NGOs. It also works with a coalition of NGOs on monitoring places of detention.

Thailand
The Office of the Ombudsman Thailand was created in the 1997 Constitution of Thailand or the "people's constitution". The name was shortened to the Ombudsmen by the 2007 Constitution of Thailand. The idea for such an office first appeared in the 1974 constitution. On 1 April 2000 the first Thai ombudsman was appointed by the king.

Ombudsmen are appointed by the King of Thailand upon the advice of the Senate of Thailand. The ombudsmen investigate complaints by the public against public officials and agencies. They have the power to prosecute, but not to enforce judgments. The 2007 constitution of 2007 charged the ombudsman to oversee the ethical practices of politicians, government officials, or state officials as well as to establish a code of ethics to be followed by all agencies including the Ombudsman Code of Ethics.

In January 2020, the Office of the Ombudsman abolished its 2012 and 2014 travel regulations, which covered only the ombudsmen's expenses during domestic and overseas trips, and replaced them with a new version that allows ombudsmen's spouses to claim identical benefits on overseas trips. The benefits include all transport and accommodation expenses and a 3,100 baht daily allowance or all expenses incurred not to exceed 4,500 baht per day. The rules took effect on 29 January after being announced in the Royal Gazette. The new regulations did not address the question of why spouses should travel at public expense.

Ombudsmen are appointed to a six-year non-renewable term.  Thailand's ombudsmen are:

 Field Marshal Anuchol Kolyanee    Supreme Commander, Ombudsman       (appointed2023)
 General Viddhavat Rajatanun, Chief Ombudsman (appointed 2012)
 Mr Boon Tapanadul, Ombudsman
 Mr Somjak Suwansujarit, Ombudsman

In 2019, the Office of the Ombudsman investigated 4,762 cases, of which 2,530 were "dealt with". Most complaints involved the Royal Thai Police and the Department of Local Administration (DLA). Since its founding in 2000, the ombudsman's office has investigated 48,441 cases and resolved 46,209 (95.4%) of them.

Turkey

The Ombudsman's Office was created after the constitutional referendum of 2010 was approved. The Ombudsman's Office is responsible for examining and investigating all manner of administrative acts, actions, attitudes and behavior in terms of respect for human rights and freedoms, conformity with the law and fairness and appropriateness within the framework of the character of the Republic of Turkey as enshrined in its Constitution. It performs its functions as part of the Parliament Speaker's Office. The Ombudsman's Office is called the Public Monitoring Institution (KDK) and has an independent and autonomous budget.

Ukraine

The office of ombudsman, or Commissioner for Human Rights, in Ukraine was instituted in 1998. The first ombudsman was Nina Karpachova until 2012. Valeriya Lutkovska was elected to the office for a five-year term by secret ballot in the Ukrainian Parliament on 24 April 2012. Under Article 55 of the 1996 Constitution, "Everyone has the right to appeal for the protection of his/her rights to the Ukrainian Parliament Commissioner for Human Rights". Article 101 provides "The Ukrainian Parliament Commissioner for Human Rights exercises parliamentary control over the observance of constitutional human and citizens' rights and freedoms." The legal basis of the office, which is also Ukraine's national human rights institution, is set out in Law 767/97, which refers to the office as the "Authorised Human Rights Representative" of the Parliament. Lyudmyla Denisova was elected to the office by the Ukrainian Parliament on 15 March 2018 and was dismissed in May 2022 by the Verkhovna Rada. She was accused of making unverifiable statements about alleged sex crimes by Russian troops. There was no new appointment.

United Kingdom
In the United Kingdom a post of Ombudsman is attached to the Westminster Parliament, jurisdiction extending to all departments of the central government and other government institutions. The office of the Parliamentary Commissioner for Administration was created in 1967, covering the activities of central government departments. A separate (National) Health Service ombudsman was subsequently created, but this office has to date always been held by the same person and the two offices are usually referred to as the Parliamentary and Health Service Ombudsman. This Ombudsman will usually investigate complaints referred to him or her by a Member of Parliament where there has been evidence of "maladministration" having occurred which has resulted in an "unremedied injustice". Complaints to the Ombudsman are subject to a "time bar" – this means that the Ombudsman may determine a complaint to be out of jurisdiction if too much time has passed between the event or course of events being complained about and the complaint being received by the Ombudsman.

Separate agencies exist to handle complaints relating to departments and agencies of the devolved administrations. These are the Northern Ireland Ombudsman, the Public Services Ombudsman for Wales and the Scottish Public Services Ombudsman, answerable respectively to the Northern Ireland Assembly, the Welsh Parliament and the Scottish Parliament.

The Local Government Ombudsman (formally the Commission for Local Government Administration – there are two Commissioners) for England and Wales was created in 1973, and a similar office for Scotland in 1974; since then, a variety of other public and private sector-specific ombudsmen have been created, along with the Northern Ireland Ombudsman.

Other ombudsman services in the United Kingdom
 Communications and Internet Services Adjudication Scheme (CISAS) provides free, independent dispute resolution with communications providers
 Financial Ombudsman Service provides consumers and small businesses with a free, independent service for resolving disputes with Banks, Insurance and other financial organisations (includes private medical insurance)
 Financial Services Ombudsman Scheme for the Isle of Man
 Furniture Ombudsman
 Housing Ombudsman: An independent service dealing with complaints against landlords and agents, and other housing disputes.
 Judicial Appointments and Conduct Ombudsman
 Legal Ombudsman
 Motor Ombudsman
Northern Ireland Public Services Ombudsman
 Office of the Independent Adjudicator reviews individual complaints by students against universities
 Ombudsman Services is a non-profit company that provides dispute resolution for the communications, energy and copyright licensing industries
 Parliamentary and Health Service Ombudsman
 Police Ombudsman for Northern Ireland
 Pensions Ombudsman investigates and decides complaints and disputes about private, civil service and other public sector pensions and pension schemes
 Prisoner Ombudsman, Northern Ireland
 Prisons and Probation Ombudsman
 Property Ombudsman deals with consumer disputes with estate or property agents
Public Services Ombudsman for Wales
 Readers' editor is a title invented by The Guardians Ian Mayes, who was appointed as the paper's first resident independent ombudsman as a bridge between readers and journalists, a role subsequently replicated on other newspapers

 Removal Industry Services Ombudsman
 Scottish Legal Services Ombudsman
Scottish Public Services Ombudsman

Former ombudsman services in the United Kingdom
 The Retail Ombudsman ran from 1 January 2015 to July 2017 when the company lost its ombudsman status

United States

Members of the United States Congress serve as federal-level ombudsmen in their oversight capacity over federal agencies, and employ staff specifically dedicated to legal compliance enforcement and investigations of maladministration on behalf of constituents.

Uruguay

In 2012 the Uruguayan ombudsman was appointed. The office was created in 2010 as a Parliamentary Officer. It is composed of five members appointed by the General Assembly of Uruguay.

Uzbekistan
The office of the Authorized Person of the Oliy Majlis of the Republic of Uzbekistan for Human Rights, or Ombudsman, was created in 1995, by an initiative of the President of Uzbekistan, but subsequently through legislation enacted in 1997, reinforced by a constitutional reform in 2003 and a new ombudsman statute in 2004. The current Authorised Person, appointed by the Supreme Assembly of Uzbekistan (Oliy Majlis), is Ulugbek Muhammadiev. The office was one of the first ombudsmen established in the Commonwealth of Independent States, and receives technical support from the Organization for Security and Cooperation in Europe.

In fiction

In the science fiction television series Babylon 5, the arbiters aboard space station Babylon 5 who preside over cases stemming from public complaints are referred to as ombuds (this is both the singular and plural designation), a sometimes used gender-neutral title for an ombudsman. Just as with their modern European counterparts, the ombuds only preside over public cases, including robbery, assault, and murder, and do not interpret law as a regular judiciary does.

Opus the penguin was an ombudsman in the strip Bloom County until he was fired.

John Perry, the protagonist of The Last Colony, written by John Scalzi starts off the novel as an ombudsman for a newly settled human colony.

The webcomic PvP ran a story arc starting at the beginning of March 2009 parodying the comic series and movie Watchmen called The Ombudsmen.

The Fox News parody show, Red Eye with Greg Gutfeld, met three times per episode with "TV's Andy Levy, Ombudsman".

See also
 
 
 
 
International Ombudsman Institute (IOI) – representing 150 public sector independent ombudsman institutions on the national, state, regional and local level around the globe

References

External links

 JPGMOnline.com – 'The role of the ombudsman in biomedical journals', Journal of Postgraduate Medicine, Vol 48, No 4, pp 292–296, 2002
 POGO.org – 'EPA Ombudsman Resigns: Accountability in Handling of Superfund Sites Threatened', Project on Government Oversight (22 April 2002)
 Transparency.org – 'What is an Ombudsman'
 Ombudsman Institutions for the Armed Forces Handbook – 'A practical guide to the role of military ombudsman', Geneva Centre for the Democratic Control of Armed Forces (DCAF)
 Ombudsman Institutions and Minority Issues, Study by the European Centre for Minority Issues
 SÖP Schlichtungsstelle für den öffentlichen Personenverkehr e.V., Ombudsman Institution of Public Transport in Germany
 Deflem, Mathieu. 2017. "The Ombuds and Social Control." The Independent Voice, IOA newsletter, May 2017.

International and regional ombudsman associations
 ACCUO - Association of Canadian College and University Ombudspersons (ACCUO)
 Asian Ombudsman Association (AOA) – "To promote the concepts of Ombudsmanship and to encourage its development in Asia"
 Association of Mediterranean Ombudsmen (AMO)
 ANZOA – Australian and New Zealand Ombudsman Association (ANZOA)
 Ombudsman Association (formerly the British and Irish Ombudsman Association, BIOA)
 European Network of Ombudspersons for Children (ENOC)
 ENOHE  – European Network of Ombudsmen in Higher Education (ENOHE), Universiteit van Amsterdam
 European Ombudsman Institute European Ombudsman Institute
 IOA – International Ombudsman Association (IOA)
 ONO – Organization of News Ombudsmen (ONO)

Ombudsman directories
 IOI – International Ombudsman Institute (international directory of ombudsmen)
 Ombuds Blog includes lists of organizational ombuds offices in corporations, academic, governmental, and other organizations

 
Legal professions
Government occupations
Ethics organizations
Swedish titles
Swedish words and phrases